Bearing Island (or also Direction Island) is a small antarctic island lying midway between Nansen Island and Enterprise Island in Wilhelmina Bay, off the west coast of Graham Land. The name Bearing or Direction Island was used for this feature by whalers in the area because the island and a rock patch on Nansen Island were used as leading marks when entering Foyn Harbor from the southeast.

See also 
 Composite Antarctic Gazetteer
 List of Antarctic and sub-Antarctic islands
 List of Antarctic islands south of 60° S
 SCAR
 Territorial claims in Antarctica

References

External links 
 U.S. Geological Survey, Atlas of Antarctic Research

Islands of Graham Land
Danco Coast